Uncle Max is a British children's comedy television series originally airing on CITV, and now CBBC. It features David Schneider as the title character, Uncle Max, and William Howe as Luke, Max's nine-year-old nephew, although in the second series Jonathon Hanly took over from William. The show is very similar in style to Mr. Bean, with the basic premise being that Uncle Max is incapable of embarking on any adventure without upsetting another individual or group of individuals in some shape or form.

The first series was filmed in Johannesburg in South Africa and produced by Andy Rowley over a seven-week block in the summer of 2005, the show was written by David Schneider and 13 episodes were made for CITV and screened on the CITV channel in 2006. The second series was filmed in Galway, in Ireland.

Schneider admitted in an interview for The Times that parts of the series are references to Laurel and Hardy; the majority of the footage is a tribute to the cartoons which Schneider grew up with, cartoons such as Tom and Jerry, Scooby-Doo and Wacky Races. Scheider also stated that the name of the Uncle is descended from his own uncle, Max Ward, who was born in Hastings but now lives in Hackney, London. Of his own Uncle Max, Schneider says that he used to get into all sorts of scrapes and adventures and would take the young David along for the ride.

The programme contains very little spoken audio at all, instead vocal noises (such as gasping, grunting, moaning, panting, banging, sighing and a bit of broken vocal) similar to the type of voice Rowan Atkinson gives Mr. Bean in the animated series and the CITV show aimed for deaf children, ZZZap!. It is made by Little Bird Pictures and marketed as a silent comedy. Many of the acts are exaggerated as in many kids shows and done in slow motion to create some tension.

List of episodes

Broadcasting
 United Kingdom – CBBC (formerly shown on CITV)
 Belgium/Flanders – Ketnet

References

External links
 
 

2006 British television series debuts
2008 British television series endings
2000s British children's television series
2000s British teen sitcoms
BBC children's television shows
English-language television shows
ITV children's television shows